Ross Alan Richard Frank Fitzsimons (born 28 May 1994) is an English professional footballer who plays as a goalkeeper for National League side Chesterfield.

Playing career

Early career
Fitzsimons began his career at Crystal Palace. On 17 January 2013, he joined Isthmian League Premier side Harrow Borough on an initial one-month loan to replace the departed Elvijs Putnins. He returned to the Isthmian League Premier on a one-month loan at Hendon in December 2013. He made his debut in a 6–0 win at Cray Wanderers on 17 December. He went on to play a total of eight league games and one cup game for the "Greens".

On 10 September 2013, he joined Conference South club Havant & Waterlooville on a one-month loan to provide cover for the injured Scott Bevan. He made his debut the "Hawks" he following day in a 2–1 win over Farnborough at West Leigh Park. He made three further appearances for the club before returning to Selhurst Park. On 20 March 2014, he joined Farnborough on a one-month loan, and made his debut two days later in a 3–1 victory at Bishop's Stortford. He played a total of ten games for the "Yellows" before returning to the "Eagles". He was released by Crystal Palace in May 2014.

On 1 July 2014, Fitzsimons signed a two-year contract with Championship club Bolton Wanderers. On 16 December 2015, he joined National League South club Bishop's Stortford on a one-month loan. The loan was later extended into a second month, and he made a total of eight appearances for the "Blues". He was released by the "Trotters" in May 2016.

On 16 August 2016, he joined National League club Braintree Town on a short-term deal to stand in for the suspended Jamie Butler. He made his debut  for the "Iron" later that day in a 2–1 defeat at Maidstone United. He joined Chelmsford City on 25 August, and manager Rod Stringer released goalkeepers Joe Welch and Colan Balkwell in the week following Fitzsimons's arrival. On 28 March 2017, he kept a clean sheet as Chelmsford beat East Thurrock United 1–0 in the final of the Essex Senior Cup. He made a total of 40 league appearances for the "Clarets", helping the club to qualify for the play-offs with a fourth-place finish; the club reached the play-off final, but were beaten 2–1 by Ebbsfleet United at Stonebridge Road.

Notts County
On 27 July 2017, Fitzsimons signed with Notts County following a trial period. Manager Kevin Nolan said that he expected Fitzsimons to challenge Adam Collin for a first team place. Fitzsimons stated that he was looking forwards to working with goalkeeping coach Mark Crossley, who he said "has a very effective way of coaching". He made his debut on 8 August, in a 3–3 draw with Scunthorpe United at Glanford Park in the first round of the EFL Cup; County lost the resulting penalty shoot-out 6–5.

He was offered new contract by Notts County at the end of the 2017–18 season.

Chesterfield (loan)
On 16 January 2020, Fitzsimons joined Chesterfield on loan for the remainder or the 2019–20 season. He was recalled by Notts County on 24 January following an injury to Sam Slocombe.

Boston United
On 22 August 2020, Fitsimons joined National League North side Boston United on an initial one-year deal. On 11 January 2021, Fitzsimons was awarded the National League North Player of the Month award for December 2020.

Stockport County 
On 26 March 2021, Fitzsimons joined National League side Stockport County on a short term contract.

Weymouth
On 12 July 2021, Fitzsimons joined Weymouth following the expiration of his Stockport contract.

St Joseph's
On 4 July 2022, it was revealed that Fitzsimons had moved to Gibraltar to join St Joseph's, with the goalkeeper being announced as part of their Europa Conference League squad to face Larne. He kept a clean sheet in both his first games as the Saints recorded an historic 1–0 aggregate victory over their Northern Irish opponents.

Career statistics

Honours

Club
Chelmsford City
Essex Senior Cup winner: 2017

Individual
National League North Player of the Month : December 2020

References

1994 births
Living people
Footballers from Hammersmith
English footballers
Association football goalkeepers
Crystal Palace F.C. players
Harrow Borough F.C. players
Hendon F.C. players
Havant & Waterlooville F.C. players
Farnborough F.C. players
Bolton Wanderers F.C. players
Bishop's Stortford F.C. players
Braintree Town F.C. players
Chelmsford City F.C. players
Notts County F.C. players
Chesterfield F.C. players
Boston United F.C. players
Stockport County F.C. players
Weymouth F.C. players
St Joseph's F.C. players
Isthmian League players
National League (English football) players
English Football League players